Shuai Pei-ling (born 24 February 1993) is a Taiwanese badminton player.

Achievements

BWF International Challenge/Series 
Mixed doubles

  BWF International Challenge tournament
  BWF International Series tournament

References

External links 
 

1993 births
Place of birth missing (living people)
Living people
Taiwanese female badminton players
21st-century Taiwanese women